Dinamo-Energija Yekaterinburg was an ice hockey team in Yekaterinburg, Russia.

History
The club was founded in 1950 as Spartak Sverdlovsk. They played in the top-level leagues in the Soviet Union and Russia. They also won the second-level Soviet and Russian leagues eight times, in 1955, 1967, 1972, 1974, 1977, 1984, 1986, and 1999.

The club folded in 2007, and a new club in Yekaterinburg, Avtomobilist Yekaterinburg, was founded a year earlier.

Notable players
 Pavel Datsyuk
 Ilya Byakin
 Sergei Shepelev
 Nikolai Khabibulin
 Alexei Yashin
 Vladimir Malakhov

External links
Team profile on eurohockey.com
Team profile on hockeyarenas.net

Yekaterinburg
Yekaterinburg
Yekaterinburg
Yekaberinburg